Vaniusha and The Giant is a 1993 Russian stop-motion animation film by Vladimir Danilevich. This film was produced by Soyuzmultfilm studio. The film is about The Friendly Newcomer from another planet. The film is the fourth film of the tetralogy, which tells about the adventures of The Newcomer Vaniusha and his friends. The first three films are The Newcomer in The Cabbage, Vaniusha The Newcomer and Vaniusha and The Space Pirate.

Plot summary 
The friends go to the distant past, many-many centuries ago. There they help The Good-Natured Giant. The Evil Knights and The Dragons hurt The Good-Natured Giant. Vaniusha with his friends help the giant and take him in their village, in the our century.

In the plot of this film are mixed the elements of the folk tales and science fiction stories.

Creators

See also
"The Newcomer in The Cabbage"
"Vaniusha The Newcomer" 
"Vaniusha and The Space Pirate"

External links
Vaniusha and The Giant (en) at Animator.ru
The Film at The Russian Movie base (rus) at Kinopoisk.ru

1993 films
Russian animated films
Soyuzmultfilm